Brian Parker (born May 30, 1992) is a former American football tight end. He was signed by the San Diego Chargers as an undrafted free agent in 2015. He played college football at the University at Albany. After retirement following the 2019-20 NFL season, Brian enrolled in law school at the University of Denver.

Professional career

San Diego Chargers
After going unselected in the 2015 NFL Draft, Parker signed with the San Diego Chargers on May 2, 2015.

Kansas City Chiefs
After being put on the waiver wire by the San Diego Chargers, Parker was picked up off waivers on September 6, 2015, by the Kansas City Chiefs. Parker made his NFL debut on November 1, 2015, against the Detroit Lions at Wembley Stadium in London. He played in nine regular season games and two playoff games with the Chiefs. On September 3, 2016, he was released by the Chiefs.

New York Jets
Parker was claimed off waivers by the New York Jets on September 4, 2016. He was waived two days later after failing his physical.

On April 6, 2017, Parker was re-signed by the Jets. On August 4, 2017, he was waived/injured by the Jets and placed on injured reserve. He was released by the team on August 11, 2017.

Denver Broncos
On November 15, 2017, Parker was signed to the Denver Broncos' practice squad. He signed a reserve/future contract with the Broncos on January 1, 2018.

On September 1, 2018, Parker was waived by the Broncos and was signed to the practice squad the next day. He was promoted to the active roster on September 29, 2018. He played in 13 regular season games with two starts.

New Orleans Saints
On October 16, 2019, Parker was signed by the New Orleans Saints, but was released three days later.

References

External links
Albany Great Danes bio
San Diego Chargers bio

1992 births
Living people
Sportspeople from Rochester, New York
Players of American football from New York (state)
American football tight ends
Albany Great Danes football players
San Diego Chargers players
Kansas City Chiefs players
New York Jets players
Denver Broncos players
New Orleans Saints players